Sarcomphalus havanensis is a species of plant in the family Rhamnaceae. It is native to Cuba and Haiti.

References

Flora of Cuba
havanensis
Endangered plants
Taxonomy articles created by Polbot